Pseudopompilia is a monotypic moth genus in the subfamily Arctiinae. Its single species, Pseudopompilia mimica, is found in the Amazon region. Both the genus and species were first described by Herbert Druce in 1898.

References

Catalogue of the Lepidoptera Phalaenae in the British Museum, Volume 1

Arctiinae